Latrobe Cricket Club (LCC) is a cricket team which represents Latrobe  in the North Western Tasmanian Cricket Association grade cricket competition, in the Australian state of Tasmania.

Honours
NWTCA Premierships:

External links
LCC Website

Tasmanian grade cricket clubs
1950 establishments in Australia
Cricket clubs established in 1950